Thubten Chökyi Dorje (1872–1935) was the 5th Dzogchen Rinpoche of Tibet in the Nyingma sect of Tibetan Buddhism.

There is evidence to suggest that Thubten Chökyi Dorje was held in high regard by his peers and was regarded as an authority in the recognizing reincarnated lamas from all the schools of Tibetan Buddhism. He is credited with affirming the reincarnation of over 200 tulku's during his lifetime.

References

5th Dzogchen Rinpoche
1872 births
1935 deaths